Pyropia tenera, also known as gim or nori, is a red algal species in the genus Pyropia. The specific name, tenera, means "delicate" and alludes to its small size.  It typically grows to lengths between 20 and 50 cm.  It is most typically found in the western Pacific Ocean and the Indian Ocean.

Mariculture
In both Wales and Japan, P. tenera (and P. yezoensis) serve as a principal component of dried seaweed food, and has been actively cultivated since ancient times.  In Japan, it is most often used in nori, (and in China as zicai, and Korea as gim), and as such is a prime ingredient in sushi. In Wales (and to some degree, England), it is used in the traditional food, laverbread.

Like many of the edible seaweed species, it is susceptible to infection by the parasitic oomycete Pythium porphyrae.

References

External links

Algae of Korea
Bangiophyceae
Edible seaweeds
Marine biota of Asia
Species described in 1897